Ai Xia (29 November 1912 – 15 February 1934) was a Chinese left-wing silent film actress and screenwriter. She committed suicide in 1934, the first Chinese actor to have done so. Her suicide inspired Cai Chusheng's classic film New Women starring Ruan Lingyu, who also killed herself soon after the release of the film.

Life and career
Ai Xia was born Yan Yinan on November 29, 1912 in Tianjin to a large middle-class family. She attended university. After graduating, she fell in love with her cousin and had a child. Her family disapproved of the relationship, resulting in her lover leaving. In 1928, she was in an arranged marriage but, as a personal protest, left home for Shanghai to pursue a career in film.

Ai Xia started her career as a stage actor with the South China Theater Society (Nanguo jushe), founded by Tian Han, before joining the Leftists Dramatists League (Zuoyi juzuojia lianmeng). She was introduced to Mingxing (Star) Film Company in 1932.
She wrote a book Xiandai yi Nüxing (A Woman of Today) in 1933. The book was adapted as a film in the same year. Despite the intrigue around the story, the film was not well received by critics because of its focus on revolution. Ai Xia was one of only two female screenwriters during the "Left-Wing" movement in Chinese film. She starred in a total of eight films in her lifetime.

Death and legacy 

Ai committed suicide in 1934 by consuming raw opium. Being the first actress in the Republic of China to do so, her death is considered iconic in Chinese film.

The film New Women is based on her life. It stars actress Ruan Lingyu who also committed suicide shortly after the film's release in 1935. 
It is speculated that director Cai Chusheng may have been romantically involved with Ai and thus, made the film for personal reasons.

Filmography 
Adventures in a Battlefield (1922)
Jiu hen xin chou (1922)
Chuncan (1933)
Good Harvest (1933)
Sons and Daughters of the Times (1933)
A Woman of Today (1933)
Two Verses One (1933)
Cosmetics of Market (1933)
Spring Silkworms (1933)

Bibliography 
A Woman of Today (现代一女性, 1933)

See also 
 Cinema of China

References

External links 

 Ai Xia at the Chinese Movie Database
A Woman of Today in the WorldCat catalog.

1912 births
1934 suicides
20th-century Chinese actresses
Actresses from Shanghai
Chinese silent film actresses
Drug-related suicides in China
Suicides in the Republic of China